Group A of the 1997 FIFA Confederations Cup took place between 12 and 16 December 1997. Brazil won the group, and advanced to the knockout stage, along with group runners-up Australia. Mexico and Saudi Arabia failed to advance.

Standings

Results

Saudi Arabia v Brazil

Mexico v Australia

Saudi Arabia v Mexico

Australia v Brazil

Saudi Arabia v Australia

Brazil v Mexico

References

A
1997–98 in Saudi Arabian football
Brazil at the 1997 FIFA Confederations Cup
1997 in Australian soccer
1997–98 in Mexican football